David Edward McDaniel (16 June 1939 – 1 November 1977) was an American science fiction author, who also wrote spy fiction, including several novels based upon the television series The Man from U.N.C.L.E.

Biography 

David McDaniel was born 16 June 1939, in Toledo, Ohio.  He studied cinematography at San Diego State University, then moved to Los Angeles. While living in Los Angeles he joined science fiction fandom, using the pseudonym Ted Johnstone. This makes him one of the few authors to write under his real name but conduct his social life under a pseudonym.  He was also known by the nickname "Tedron", the name of his character in a Shared universe fantasy called Coventry.

David McDaniel died sometime in the early morning of 1 November 1977 while alone at his home. At the time of his death he was contracted to fly to Baton Rouge, Louisiana for freelance work as a cameraman.

Professional career 

McDaniel sold two stories while still an undergraduate.  Pulp writer Noel Loomis was teaching a course on writing at San Diego State, and offered an automatic "A" to any student who sold a story. McDaniel found a boy's magazine whose requirements he could meet, sent them two stories and they accepted both.

 A young English boy sees Vikings about to attack his village.  He rouses the village and helps drive off the Vikings.
 A short science fiction story set in space about a teenage boy.

McDaniel wrote his first science fiction novel, titled The Weapons of XXX and submitted it to Ace Books in early 1965. Terry Carr, a junior editor at Ace, liked it, but the chief editor, Don Wollheim wasn't convinced, so they returned it. Ace then signed a contract to publish original novels based on the NBC television series "The Man from U.N.C.L.E.". Carr remembered McDaniel's The Weapons of XXX and since he knew McDaniel was a big fan of the television show, so he asked his to submit a novel for The Man from U.N.C.L.E project. The fourth novel to appear in the series was the result, The Dagger Affair (1965), which was one of the biggest sellers in the series. Carr asked him to write another, The Vampire Affair, and then signed him to a contract for six more. Royalty statements received from Ace Books showed The Vampire Affair as the biggest seller of the six U.N.C.L.E. novels that McDaniel wrote.

McDaniels first novel, The Weapons of XXX eventually was published by Ace under the title The Arsenal Out of Time in 1967. The book as originally written was slightly longer than Ace's standard book length at the time, so he was asked to shorten it by about 2000 words. He deleted a scene which did nothing to advance the plot but humorously depicted (Tuckerized) a personal friend of McDaniels. The missing scene was later published in the fanzine The Best of Apa-L #3.

His last novel, The Final Affair, was intended to by Carr to be the final book in The Man from U.N.C.L.E. series. However, McDaniel was several months late finishing the book, and by that time the series was no longer on TV and The Final Affair was never published, but it can be found online (see External links).

More details can be found in "The inside story of how DMcDaniel became involved in UNCLE" [sic] at The Fans From U.N.C.L.E. website.

Bibliography

U.N.C.L.E. novels
 The Dagger Affair (#4 in the series) (1966)
 The Vampire Affair (#6) (1966)
 The Monster Wheel Affair (#8) (1967)
 The Rainbow Affair (#13) (1967)
 The Utopia Affair (#15) (1968)
 The Hollow Crown Affair (#17) (1969)
 The Final Affair (unpublished)

Other TV related novels
 "The Prisoner" series: The Prisoner: Number Two, (1969) also known as Who is Number Two, the second book in the series based on the TV series

Stand alone novels
 The Arsenal Out of Time, Ace Books, 1967 (Ace G-667, SBN 020-07667) (cover by Frank Kelly Freas)

Short Stories
 "Quiet Village", a short story set in the same fictional history published in Analog in 1970 and reprinted in the collection There Will Be War, edited by Jerry Pournelle, Tor Books, 1983.
 "Prognosis: Terminal," in 2020 Vision, Jerry Pournelle, ed. Avon Books, 1974.

Fan career 

Under his fan name of Ted Johnstone, McDaniel was active in an SF fan APA called The Cult, where he served as Official Arbiter.  He served as editor of the LASFS's Official Organ, Shangri L'Affaires (aka "Shaggy") in 1964-5.  He was active in the LASFS's weekly Amateur Press Association, APA L, for over a year, publishing a weekly zine titled, "B-Roll Negative."  In addition, he wrote a column, "A Slow Train through Gondor."

At various times he served as "Director" (presiding officer) and as "Scribe" (secretary) of the LASFS, and is remembered as a "Patron Saint". (substantial donor).

He was Chairman of Westercon XX in 1967 (officially called "Shere-Con" because it was held at the Sheraton-West hotel in Los Angeles, but also referred to as "Double-Cross Con" because of internal fights within the operating committee. Shortly before the convention actually began, Brandon Lamont was named acting chairman by the committee for the duration of the convention.)

McDaniel wrote several filk songs, including "High Fly the Nazgul-O" (tune: "Green Grow the Rushes-O) and "The Mimeo Crank Chanty" (tune: "Haul Away Joe").

Some photos of McDaniel/Johnstone can be found on the LASFS website.

References

External links 

 
 The Fans from U.N.C.L.E. website
 Key to David McDaniel's novels
 The Final Affair online

1939 births
20th-century American novelists
American male novelists
American science fiction writers
Writers from Toledo, Ohio
1977 deaths
20th-century American male writers
Novelists from Ohio